The Scytho-Siberian world was an archaeological horizon which flourished across the entire Eurasian Steppe during the Iron Age from approximately the 9th century BC to the 2nd century AD. It included the Scythian, Sauromatian and Sarmatian cultures of Eastern Europe, the Saka-Massagetae and Tasmola cultures of Central Asia, and the Aldy-Bel, Pazyryk and Tagar cultures of south Siberia. 

The Scythian-Siberian world was characterized by the Scythian triad, which are similar, yet not identical, styles of weapons, horses' bridles, and jewelry and decorative art. The question of how related these cultures were is disputed among scholars. Its peoples were of diverse origins, and included not just Scythians, from which the cultures are named, but other peoples as well, such as the Cimmerians, Massagetae, Saka, Sarmatians, and obscure forest steppe populations. Mostly speakers of the Scythian branch of the Iranian languages, all of these peoples are sometimes collectively referred to as Scythians, Scytho-Siberians, Early Nomads, or Iron Age Nomads.

Origins and spread

The Scytho-Siberian world emerged on the Eurasian Steppe at the dawn of the Iron Age in the early 1st millennium BC. Its origins has long been a source of debate among archaeologists. The Pontic–Caspian steppe was initially thought to have been their place of origin, until the Soviet archaeologist Aleksey Terenozhkin suggested a Central Asian origin.

Recent excavations at Arzhan in Tuva, Russia have uncovered the earliest Scythian-style kurgan yet found. Similarly the earliest examples of the animal style art which would later characterize the Scytho-Siberian cultures have been found near the upper Yenisei River and North China, dating to the 10th century BC. Based on these finds, it has been suggested that the Scytho-Siberian world emerged at an early period in southern Siberia. It is probably in this area that the Scythian way of life initially developed. Recent genetic studies have concluded that the Scythians formed from European-related groups of the Yamnaya culture and East Asian/Siberian groups during the Bronze Age and early Iron Age.

The Scytho-Siberian world quickly came to stretch from the Pannonian Basin in the west to the Altai Mountains in the east. There were, however, significant cultural differences between east and west. Over time they came in contact with other ancient civilizations, such as Assyria, Greece and Persia. In the late 1st millennium BC, peoples belonging to the Scytho-Siberian world expanded into Iran (Sakastan), India (Indo-Scythians) and the Tarim Basin. In the early centuries AD the western part of the Scytho-Siberian world came under pressure from the Goths and other Germanic peoples. The end of the Scythian period in archaeology has been set at approximately the 2nd century AD.

Recent archeological and genetic data confirmed that Western and Eastern Scythians of the 1st millennium BC originated independently, but both formed from a combination of a Yamnaya-related ancestry component from the area of the European steppes, and an East Asian-related component most closely corresponding to the modern North Siberian Nganasan people of the lower Yenesei. Furthermore, archaeological evidence now tends to suggest that the origins of the Scytho-Siberian world, characterized by its kurgan burial mounds and its Animal style of the 1st millennium BC, are to be found among Eastern Scythians rather than their Western counterparts: eastern kurgans are older than western ones (such as the Altaic kurgan Arzhan 1 in Tuva), and elements of the Animal style are first attested in areas of the Yenisei river and modern-day China in the 10th century BC. The rapid spread of the Scytho-Siberian world, from the Eastern Scythians to the Western Scythians, is also confirmed by significant east-to-west gene flow across the steppes during the 1st millennium BC.

Peoples

Ethnicity 
The peoples of the Scytho-Siberian world are mentioned by contemporary Persian and Greek historians. They were mostly speakers of Iranian languages.

Despite belonging to similar material cultures, the peoples of the Scytho-Siberian world belonged to many separate ethnic groups.
Peoples associated with the Scytho-Siberian world include speakers of the Scythian languages:
 Massagetae
 Sarmatians
 Saka
 Scythians
 Agathyrsi
 Sigynnae
 Cimmerians
 Forest steppe people

Although the peoples of the forest steppe were part of the Scytho-Siberian world, their origins are obscure; there might have been early Slavs, Balts, and Finnic peoples among them. The settled population of the Scytho-Siberian world areas also included Thracians.

Terminology
Among the diverse peoples of the Scytho-Siberian world, the Scythians are the most famous, due to the reports on them published by the 5th century Greek historian Herodotus. The ancient Persians referred to all nomads of steppe as Saka. In modern times, the term Scythians is sometimes applied to all the peoples associated with the Scytho-Siberian world. Within this terminology it is often distinguished between "western" Scythians living on the Pontic–Caspian steppe, and "eastern" Scythians living on the Eastern Steppe. The term Scytho-Siberians has also been applied to all peoples associated with the Scytho-Siberian world. The terms Early Nomads and Iron Age Nomads have also been used. The terms Saka or Sauromates, and Scytho-Siberians, is sometimes used for the "eastern" Scythians living in Central Asia and southern Siberia respectively. 

The ambiguity of the term Scythian has led to a lot of confusion in literature.

Nicola Di Cosmo (1999) questions the validity of referring to the cultures of all early Eurasian nomads as "Scythian", and recommends the use of alternative terms such as Early Nomadic.

By ancient authors, the term "Scythian" eventually came to be applied to a wide range of peoples "who had no relation whatever to the original Scythians", such as Huns, Goths, Türks, Avars, Khazars, and other unnamed nomads.

Characteristics 

The cultures of the Scytho-Siberian world are recognized for three characteristics known as the Scythian triad:
 similar, yet not identical, shapes for horses' bridles,
 their weapons, especially their distinct short, composite bows, and
 the styling on their jewelry and decorations.

Their art was made in the animal style, so characteristic that it is also called Scythian art.

Finds

In the beginning of the 18th century, Russian explorers began uncovering Scythian finds throughout their newly acquired territories.

Significant Scythian archaeological finds have been uncovered up to recent times. A major find are the Pazyryk burials, which were discovered on the Ukok Plateau in the 1940s. The finds are notably for revealing the form of mummification practiced by the Scythians. Another important find is the Issyk kurgan.

Society

The Scythians were excellent craftsmen with complex cultural traditions. Horse sacrifices are common in Scythian graves, and several of the sacrificed horses were evidently old and well-kept, indicating that the horse played a prominent role in Scythian society. They played a prominent role in the network connecting ancient civilizations known as the Silk Road. The homogeneity of patrilineal lineages and contrasting diversity of matrilineal lineages of samples from Scythian burial sites indicate that Scythian society was strongly patriarchal.

Numerous archaeological finds have revealed that the Scythians led a warlike life: Their competition for territory must have been fierce. The numerous weapons placed in graves are indicative of a highly militarized society. Scythian warfare was primarily conducted through mounted archery. They were the first great power to perfect this tactic. The Scythians developed a new, powerful type of bow known as the Scythian bow. Sometimes they would poison their arrows.

Physical appearance
The Scythians were tall and powerfully built, even by modern standards. Skeletons of Scythian elites differ from those of modern people by their longer arms and legs, and stronger bone formation. Commoners were shorter, averaging 10–15 cm (4–6 in) shorter than the elite.

Their physical traits are characteristic of Iranian peoples and support a common origin indicated by the linguistic evidence, however, people of mixed physical appearance are also indicated by the archaeological and historical evidence.

Numerous Eastern Scythian remains have been found in an excellent state of preservation in the Altai mountains, with soft tissues such as skin and hair preserved. From the Pazyryk valley, Scythian remains show a variety of hair colors, ranging from black to bright chestnut. Mummified Scythian warriors from the Ukok plateau and Mongolia had blond hair. 

Preserved skin tissue also reveals that the eastern Scythians had tattoos. Tattooing is not thought to have been practiced by western Scythians.

Genetics

The genetics of remains from Scythian-identified cultures show broad general patterns, among these are remarkably different histories for men and women. Their ethnic affiliations are summarized above. Their familial inter-relations are discussed below.

There are two distinct paternal lineages in the east and west, with the eastern and western paternal lineages being themselves homogeneous. The paternal western Scythian haplogroups are closely related to modern Europeans, but disappeared from the Scythian steppe region, being eventually replaced by the eastern Scythians. The surviving modern populations most closely related to the paternal western Scythian lineages are in Europe; apparently none remain in mid- and northern-Asia.

In contrast, the maternal lineages among Scythians are diverse, and the eastern and western maternal lines were significantly mixed. The free intermarriage of women across all of the Scytho-Siberian world could be what maintained trans-Scythian cultural coherence. Further, rather than dying out, local maternal Scythian lineages persist among modern people living near the excavated graves.

Ethnogenesis
In 2017, a genetic study of various cultures of the Scytho-Siberian world was published in Nature Communications. The study found that Late Bronze Age Scythians (and other Central Asian groups) harbored nearly exclusively European-related (Western Steppe Herders) ancestry, close or identical to the earlier Sintashta, Andronovo, and Afanasievo culture. Since the late Iron Age the Scythian gene pool became more diverse, and late Iron Age Scythians can be described as admixture between dominant European-related ancestry from the Yamnaya culture, with an East Asian component. Iron Age Scythians can be differentiated into Western Scythians (in Central Asia) which had predominantly European-related ancestry, and Eastern Scythians, which harbored increased East Asian-related admixture. While the origin of the Scythian material culture is disputed, their evidence suggest an ultimate origin in the Eastern Steppe, close the Altai Mountains, perhaps linked to the earlier Afanasievo culture. Modern populations relative closely related to the ancient Scythians were found to be populations living in proximity to the sites studied, suggesting genetic continuity.

Krzewińska et al. (2018) found that the Eastern Scythian Steppe populations were genetically heterogeneous and had next to their European-related ancestry also genetic affinities with populations from several other regions including the Far East and the southern Urals.

Järve et al. (2019) found that the nomadic Scythians were of different genetic origins, while sharing a common material culture. They suggested that migrations must have played a role in the emergence of the Scythians as the dominant power on the Pontic steppe.

A 2021 study by Gnecchi-Ruscone et al., concluded that the Eastern Scythians around the Altai mountain were of multiple origins and that they originated from an admixture event in the Bronze Age. The Eastern Scythians genetically formed from mixture between Steppe_MLBA sources (which could be associated with different cultures such as Sintashta, Srubnaya, and Andronovo) and a specific East-Eurasian source that was already present during the LBA in the neighboring northern Mongolia region.

Western Scythian culture genetics
This section lists the findings of genetic studies of the remains excavated in western Asia and eastern Europe ascribed to one of the Scythian cultures.

Initially, the Western Scythians carried only West Eurasian maternal haplogroups, but the frequency of East Eurasian haplogroups rises to 26% in samples dated to the 2nd century BCE. Among the Western Scythians discovered at Rostov-on-Don, in European Russia, East Eurasian maternal haplogroups make up 37.5% of the total. 
These results possibly suggest the increasing presence of East Eurasian women in Western Scythian populations, although autosomal genetic evidence is needed to confirm this observation.

In terms of paternal haplogroups, most Western Scythian remains from the North Pontic region have been observed to carry a specific clade haplogroup R1b, which distinguishes them from Eastern Scythians, who generally exhibited haplogroup haplogroup R1a, as well as other haplogroups. One Scythian from the Samara region carried R1a-Z93.

Eastern Scythian culture genetics
This section lists the findings of genetic studies of the remains excavated in central Eurasia and the eastern steppe ascribed to one of the Scythian cultures.

Pilipenko (2018) studied mtDNA from remains of the Tagar culture, which was part of the Scytho-Siberian world. Although found in Khakassia, at the eastern extreme of the Eurasian steppe, remains from the early stage of the Tagar culture were found to be closely related to those of contemporary Scythians on the Pontic-Caspian steppe far to the west, exhibiting both West Eurasian and East Eurasian lineages. However, the fossils from the middle stage of the Tagar culture showed a strong increase in East Eurasian maternal lineages, increasing from 35% to nearly 45% by the middle stage. Notably, the mtDNA haplogroups C and D increased from 8.7 to 37.8%. 

Mary, et al. (2019)  studied the genetics of remains from the Aldy-Bel culture in and around Tuva in central Asia, adjacent to western Mongolia; the Aldy-Bel culture is considered one of the Scytho-Siberian cultures. The authors also analyzed the maternal haplogroups of 26 Siberian Scythian remains from Arzhan. 50% of the remains carried an East Eurasian haplogroup, while 50% carried a West Eurasian haplogroup. In contrast to the paternal lineages, the maternal lineages were extremely diverse. The most common lineages were variants of haplogroup C4. 

Mary, et al. (2019) also determined the paternal haplogroups of 16 Siberian Scythian males of the Aldy-Bel culture. 56.2% of the haplogroups belonged to varieties of the West Eurasian haplogroup R1a. On the other hand, 31.2% belonged to the East Eurasian haplogroup Q1b, which was found in Bronze Age samples from the Altai mountains. Aditionally, one specimen (6.25%) carried haplogroup N-M231 which is associated with neolithic remains from Northern China. 

The Scythian groups of the Pontic Steppe and South Siberia had significantly different paternal genetics, which suggests that the Pontic and South Siberian Scythians had completely different paternal origins, with almost no paternal gene flow between them.

Unterländer, et al. (2017) fount that eastern Scythians share strong genetic similarities with modern day Turkic speakers in Siberia, which supports a "multi-regional origin" of the eastern Iron Age Scythians. According to Tikhonov, et al. (2019), the eastern Scythians "possibly bore proto-Turkic elements". Another study suggests that this research casts doubt on the historical consensus that the Scythians only spoke an Iranian language. Eastern Scythians share common ancestry with contemporary Turkic, Mongolian, and Siberian groups in eastern Eurasia, while evidence of Scythian ancestry is strongest among speakers of the Kipchak languages. There is strong evidence for continuity from the eastern Scythians to the Turkic speakers of the Altai region.

See also
 Eurasian nomads
 Early Slavs

Notes

References

Bibliography

Further reading

  — Good; free download (with registration).

 

 

 

 

 

 

 

 
9th-century BC establishments
2nd-century disestablishments
Archaeological cultures of Central Asia
Archaeological cultures of Eastern Europe
Archaeological cultures of Northern Asia
Iranian archaeological cultures
Iron Age cultures of Asia
Iron Age cultures of Europe
Cultures